Cortes de la Frontera is a town and municipality in the province of Málaga, part of the autonomous community of Andalusia in southern Spain. The municipality is situated approximately 40 kilometres from Ronda, 20 from Benaoján and 159 from the provincial capital. It has a population of approximately 4,000 residents. The natives are called Cortesanos.

References

Municipalities in the Province of Málaga
Towns in Spain